Eastern Range (Vostochny Khrebet) is a mountain range on the Kamchatka Peninsula, Kamchatka Krai, Russian Far East. It is a complex range mainly consisting of volcanic peaks. Together with the Middle Range, it is one of the two main mountain systems of the peninsula.

Geography
The Eastern Range stretches roughly from NNE to SSW for  along the eastern part of the peninsula between the southern Karaginsky Gulf at the northern end and Avacha Bay at the southern. The range is made up of a number of separate ranges having steep western slopes and more gentle eastern ones. 
The central Kamchatka Depression, with the valley of the Kamchatka River, separates the Eastern Range from the Middle Range of the peninsula to the west. The main part of the Eastern Range is part of the East Kamchatka Anticline dating back to the Cenozoic orogeny, composed of Upper Cretaceous sediments and volcanic rocks, such as basalt and tuff.

Subranges
The system of the Eastern Range comprises a number of subranges, including the following:
 Kumroch Range, highest point . The northernmost subrange.
 Tumrok Range, highest point .
 Valagin Range, highest point .
 Ganal Range, highest point . The southernmost subrange .

Some geographic works include the Kluchevskaya group of volcanoes, highest point , as well as the Gamchen Range, highest point , as part of the Eastern Range. The first is located to the west of the Kumroch Range and the other to the east of the Tumrok Range.

The Eastern Kamchatka zone of recent and ongoing volcanic eruptions is around the area where the Valagin and the Tumrok ranges meet, with a number of active volcanoes, such as the Kizimen, Shiveluch and Karymskaya Sopka.

Flora

The lower parts of the slopes of the Eastern Range are covered in birch and fir forests and dwarf cedar shrub, as well as rhododendron.

See also
List of mountains in Russia
List of volcanoes in Russia

References

External links

Mountain ranges of Russia
Mountains of Kamchatka Krai